Shahar Ginanjar (born 4 November 1990 in Purwakarta) is an Indonesian professional footballer who plays as a goalkeeper for Liga 1 club Borneo.

Personal life 
He got married on January 24, 2015.

Club career 
He extended his contract with Persib Bandung for two years on 27 November 2013.

International career
He made his international debut with the Indonesia U-23 on 13 July 2013 against Singapore U-23 coming on as a substitute.

He called for the Indonesia against  Malaysia on 14 September 2014, but did not play.

Honours

Club
Pelita Jaya U-21
 Indonesia Super League U-21: 2008–09

Persib Bandung
 Indonesia Super League: 2014
 Indonesia President's Cup: 2015

Mitra Kukar
 General Sudirman Cup: 2015

Persija Jakarta
 Liga 1: 2018

Dewa United
 Liga 2 third place (play-offs): 2021

International
Indonesia U-23
 Islamic Solidarity Games  Silver medal: 2013

References

External links
 

1990 births
Living people
People from Purwakarta Regency
Sportspeople from West Java
Association football goalkeepers
Indonesian footballers
Liga 1 (Indonesia) players
Pelita Jaya FC players
Persib Bandung players
Mitra Kukar players
PS Barito Putera players
PSM Makassar players
Persija Jakarta players
Dewa United F.C. players
Borneo F.C. players
Indonesia youth international footballers
Indonesian Super League-winning players